Alexander is an unincorporated community located in southern Erath County in Central Texas. Alexander is in the southern part of the county along Texas State Highway 6 and Fm-914. The town was originally called: "Harper's Mill" when the Post Office was approved for operation around the 1870s. The name was changed in the 1880s when the Texas Central line part of the historic Katy Railroad was built from east to west through the townsite on its way from the Waco area to Stamford with a branch to Cross Plains from the line at De Leon. In 1907 the Stephenville North and South Texas Railway part of the Cotton Belt Route was constructed from north to south and crossed with the Katy's line in Alexander. This made the town an important community for business in the area. The Cotton Belt Route ran from Stephenville through to nearby Carlton. On October 17, 1934, the Cotton Belt Route was abandoned from Stephenville to Hamilton. The Katy Railroad remained through Alexander until its abandonment in the late 1960s. The Alexander post office closed in 1970 and the population remained at a steady 40 from the 1970s through 2000.

References 

 Texas Escapes.com Online entry for Alexander
 Katy Railroad Historic Society website
 Handbook of Texas Online entry for the Stephenville North & South Texas
 Handbook of Texas Online entry for Alexander, Texas

Unincorporated communities in Erath County, Texas
Unincorporated communities in Texas
Ghost towns in North Texas